Jérémie Mumbere Mbusa (born 10 June 1991) is a Congolese footballer who plays as a midfielder for AS Vita Club.

References

1991 births
Living people
Democratic Republic of the Congo footballers
Democratic Republic of the Congo international footballers
Association football midfielders
Democratic Republic of the Congo expatriate footballers
Expatriate footballers in the Republic of the Congo
Democratic Republic of the Congo expatriate sportspeople in the Republic of the Congo
CARA Brazzaville players
Étoile du Congo players
FC Saint-Éloi Lupopo players
AS Maniema Union players
AS Vita Club players
21st-century Democratic Republic of the Congo people
Democratic Republic of the Congo A' international footballers
2020 African Nations Championship players